In enzymology, a cyclomaltodextrinase is an enzyme that catalyzes the chemical reaction

cyclomaltodextrin + H2O  linear maltodextrin

Thus, the two substrates of this enzyme are cyclomaltodextrin and H2O, whereas its product is linear maltodextrin.

This enzyme belongs to the family of hydrolases, specifically those glycosidases that hydrolyse O- and S-glycosyl compounds.  The systematic name of this enzyme class is cyclomaltodextrin dextrin-hydrolase (decyclizing). Other names in common use include cycloheptaglucanase, cyclohexaglucanase, and cyclodextrinase.  This enzyme participates in starch and sucrose metabolism and acarbose degradation. The cyclomaltodextrinase is capable of degradation of acarbose to glucose and acarviosine-glucose.

Structural studies

References

Further reading 

 

EC 3.2.1
Enzymes of known structure